Pristobrycon maculipinnis, sometimes known as the marbled piranha, is a species of serrasalmid endemic to Venezuela.

Habitat 
P. maculipinnis mainly inhabits black or clear acidic waters in the Orinoco basin in the state of Amazonas in Venezuela. Its type locality is a tributary of the Pamoni River in the Casiquiare River Basin, although it can also be found in the Atabapo River basin.

Description
The body of P. maculipinnis is discoid to oval with the anterodorsal slightly convex. It has a robust and wide head with a blunt snout. Preanal spines and ectopterygoid teeth are not found on this species. It has a wide adipose fin. The head of the species is dark in color in adults with the mandibular and opercular areas dark red. The iris of the species is golden yellow with a dark transversal band. 

The body of P. maculipinnis is a metallic greyish color adorned with many dark spots, giving the species a marbled appearance, although the abdominal area can be dark red or orange in color. The fins of the species are generally red or orange in color and may also display dark spots. The adipose fin of the species is dark with several spots.

P. maculipinnis reaches 24.8 cm (9.8 inches) in standard length.

Behaviour
It is a predatory fish that consumes smaller fish and attacks fins, although the diet of juveniles includes aquatic insects and crustaceans such as shrimps. It is also known to eat fruit originating from the surrounding gallery forest. It is a solitary species that is typically not seen in schools.

References

External links

Serrasalmidae
Freshwater fish of South America
Fish of Venezuela
Endemic fauna of Venezuela
Taxa named by William Lee Fink
Taxa named by Antonio Machado-Allison
Fish described in 1992